Shouchang is a town located in the western part of Zhejiang Province, China, currently under the administration of Jiande City.

Administration
, it administers the following four residential communities and 23 villages:
Hengshan Community
Dongchang Community
Aixi (Xihu) Community
Wangjiang Community
Sanyan Village
Shiquan Village
Dongmen Village
Chengbei Village
Chengzhong Village
Henanli Village
Shibaqiao Village
Bujiapeng Village
Honglu Village
Yuhong Village
Datangbian Village
Chenjia Village
Shanfeng Village
Guihua Village
Yongjiaqiao Village
Nanpu Village
Ximen Village
Zhou Village
Tongjia Village
Lühetang Village
Xihua Village
Wushi Village
Jinqiao Village

History
The county was established in 225 AD with the name Xinchang, during the Three Kingdoms Period. The name was changed to Shouchang In 280 AD.  It was formerly a separate county, but was merged into Jiande in the 1950s.

GDP
 Industrial Production: RMB ￥1.38 billion in 2005
 Agricultural Production: RMB ￥167 million in 2005
 Expenditure on R&D: RMB ￥285 million in 2005

Transport
 The nearest major airport is Hangzhou Xiaoshan International Airport.  Quzhou Airport and Yiwu Airport are closer but much smaller.
 China National Highway 320
 China National Highway 330
 Hangxinjing Expressway
 Jinqian Railway

References

External links
Official site on economic issues
Official site

Towns of Zhejiang
Jiande